4383 Suruga, provisional designation , is a Vestian asteroid and binary system from the inner regions of the asteroid belt, approximately 6.5 kilometers in diameter. It was discovered on 1 December 1989, by Japanese astronomer Yoshiaki Oshima at Gekko Observatory, Japan. The asteroid was named after the former Japanese Suruga Province. Its synchronous minor-planet moon, measures approximately 1.33 kilometers and has a period of 16.386 hours.

Orbit and classification 

Suruga is an orbital member of the Vesta family in the inner main-belt. It orbits the Sun at a distance of 2.3–2.6 AU once every 3 years and 9 months (1,380 days). Its orbit has an eccentricity of 0.06 and an inclination of 7° with respect to the ecliptic.

Physical characteristics 

Suruga has been characterized as a bright V-type asteroid by PanSTARRS photometric survey.

Rotation and shape 

In February 2013, a rotational lightcurve of Suruga was obtained from photometric observations by American astronomer Brian Warner at his Palmer Divide Observatory in Colorado. Lightcurve analysis gave a well-defined rotation period of 3.4069 hours with a brightness variation of 0.14 magnitude, which indicates a nearly spheroidal shape.

These observations supersede a period of 3.4069 hours (Δmag 0.08) of an ambiguous lightcurve, obtained by Japanese astronomers during lightcurve survey of V-type asteroids in December 2002.

Diameter and albedo 

According to the survey carried out by NASA's Wide-field Infrared Survey Explorer with its subsequent NEOWISE mission, Suruga measures 6.471 kilometers in diameter and its surface has an albedo of 0.320, while the Collaborative Asteroid Lightcurve Link assumes a standard albedo for stony asteroids of 0.20 and calculates a diameter of 7.13 kilometers with an absolute magnitude of 13.1.

Satellite 

During Brian Warner's photometric observations in 2013, it was revealed, that Suruga is a synchronous binary system with a minor-planet moon in orbit. The satellite has an orbital period of 16.386. Based on the brightness variations of the mutual eclipsing/occulation events, Warner estimates that the satellite's mean-diameter is at least 21% of that of Surugas (Ds/Dp of >). The Johnston's Archive derives a satellite diameter of 1.33 kilometer and estimates a semi-major axis of 11 kilometers for the moon's orbit.

Naming 

This minor planet was named after the former Suruga Province, what is now the Shizuoka Prefecture in central Japan. It is the place where the discovering Gekko Observatory is located (also see ). The approved naming citation was published by the Minor Planet Center on 28 May 1991.

References

External links 
 Three Binary Discoveries From The Palmer Divide Observatory, Brian Warner (2014)
 Lightcurve plot of 4383 Suruga, Palmer Divide Observatory, B. D. Warner (2013)
 Asteroids with Satellites, Robert Johnston, johnstonsarchive.net
 Asteroid Lightcurve Database (LCDB), query form (info )
 Dictionary of Minor Planet Names, Google books
 Asteroids and comets rotation curves, CdR – Observatoire de Genève, Raoul Behrend
 Discovery Circumstances: Numbered Minor Planets (1)-(5000) – Minor Planet Center
 
 

004383
Discoveries by Yoshiaki Oshima
Named minor planets
004383
19891201